Fellows of the Royal Society elected in 1971.

Fellows

Norman Henry Ashton
John Herbert Beynon
Brian Blundell Boycott
Alan Carrington
Douglas Harold Copp
Geoffrey Sharman Dawes
Michael Ellis Fisher
David Victor Glass
 Sir John Gurdon
Brian S. Hartley
Lionel Haworth
Raymond Hide
 Sir John Kingman
Joel Mandelstam
Eric Harold Mansfield
Walter Marshall, Baron Marshall of Goring
John Lennox Monteith
Frank Reginald Nunes Nabarro
Arthur Charles Neish
Paul Robert Owen
John Charles Polanyi
Adrian Frank Posnette
Richard Edmund Reason
Florence Gwendolen Rees
John Donald Rose
George William Series
Robert Millner Shackleton
Trevor Ian Shaw
Basil Weedon
Alan Marmaduke Wetherell
Harry Blackmore Whittington
Douglas Robert Wilkie

Foreign members

Henri Cartan
Stephen Kuffler
Kurt Mothes
Karl Ziegler

Statute 12 
Hirohito, Emperor of Japan

References

1971
1971 in science
1971 in the United Kingdom